Livingston Peak, el.  is a mountain peak in the Absaroka Range near Livingston, Montana. The peak is located within the Gallatin National Forest and the Absaroka-Beartooth Wilderness.

Notes

Mountains of Montana
Mountains of Park County, Montana